Stormy Weathers is a 1992 action adventure television film directed by Will Mackenzie and starring Cybill Shepherd.

Plot

An Italian aristocrat hires detective Samantha Weathers (Cybill Shepherd) to uncover the details of an old inheritance issue.  The more she looks, the more complicated the case becomes.

A female private eye's investigation into the disappearance of an Italian aristocrat reveals an underhand plot involving drug smuggling, murder and corruption in high places. Adventure, starring Cybill Shepherd, Charlie Schlatter and Robert Beltran.

Cast
 Cybill Shepherd as Samantha Weathers
 Robert Beltran as Gio
 Charlie Schlatter as Squirrel
 Kurt Fuller as Ernie Horshack
 Diane Salinger as Bogey
 Roy Thinnes as Andrew Chase
 Mimi Kuzyk as Gloria Chase
 Kene Holiday as Rashid (as Kene Holliday)
 Philip Baker Hall as Dr. Comden
 Tony Lo Bianco as Lt. Frank Orozco
 Al Fann as Cecil Wilkes
 Ethel Ayler as Clara Wilkes
 Arthur Malet as Pidge
 Lilyan Chauvin as Mrs. Comden

External links 
 
 

American mystery films
American detective films
1992 crime films
1992 films
1990s English-language films
1990s American films